Willoughby on the Wolds is a small village in Nottinghamshire, England, on the border with Leicestershire.  Its nearest neighbouring villages are Wysall, Widmerpool, Wymeswold and Keyworth, with the nearest towns and cities being Loughborough, Melton Mowbray, Nottingham and Leicester. According to the 2001 census it had a population of 484, increasing to 572 at the 2011 census.

The village has its own Parish Council and comes within the jurisdiction of the Nottinghamshire County Council. The area postcode for the village, however, is in Leicestershire (LE12).

The village is the approximate location of the minor civil war battle of Willoughby Field which took place in July 1648. It is also closely linked with the Roman encampment of Vernometum on the Fosse way which runs only a few hundred yards from the village.

See also
Church of St. Mary and All Saints, Willoughby-on-the-Wolds

References

External links

 Willoughby village website
 A brief history of the village

Villages in Nottinghamshire
Rushcliffe